Colorado's 8th congressional district is a new district in the United States House of Representatives that was apportioned after the 2020 United States census. The first congressional seat to be added to Colorado's congressional delegation since 2001, the 8th district was drawn before the 2022 elections. The district was drawn by the Colorado Independent Redistricting Commission and approved in an 11–1 vote on September 28, 2021, before being approved unanimously by the Colorado Supreme Court on November 1, 2021.

Characteristics
Colorado's 8th congressional district stretches along Interstate 25, encompassing sections of Adams County, Larimer County, and Weld County. The largest population centers are Brighton, Commerce City, Greeley, Johnstown, Northglenn, and Thornton. The district has the largest number of Hispanic residents of any congressional district in Colorado, making up 38.5% of the adult population. The 8th congressional district is viewed as competitive, with the Democratic Party holding a 3% lead in active registered voters and an average margin of victory of 1.3% between eight statewide elections held between 2016 and 2020. Joe Biden won the area that is now the 8th district by 4.7% in the 2020 United States presidential election. Republicans are strongest in Greeley and Weld County, while the northern Denver suburbs in Adams County lean Democratic.

Election results from other races 
These results vary from older lines to current

List of members representing the district

Election results

2022

See also

Colorado's congressional districts
List of United States congressional districts

References 

8
Constituencies established in 2023
2023 establishments in Colorado